THREE is a British AOR release by former and current members of Graham Oliver's Saxon and Christie.

Track listing
All music composed by Kev Moore and Adrian 'Fos' Foster, all lyrics written by Moore.

 "Shackled to Your Heart" ('94 Mix)
 "Paradise Beach"
 "Marlena" ('94 Mix)
 "The Pimp"
 "Burning Our Lifeblood"
 "Just a Memory"
 "Beaver Patrol"
 "Good Love"
 "Innocence (Part One)"
 "Innocence (Part Two)"
 "A Trick of the Light"

Personnel 
Tubeless Hearts
 Kev Moore – lead and backing vocals, bass, keyboards, and acoustic guitar
 Adrian 'Fos' Foster – guitars, guitar synth, vocals
 Simon Kay – drums and vocals

Guest musicians
 Graham Oliver on "Beaver Patrol" and "Good Love"

Production
 Producer – Adrian 'Fos' Foster
 Recorded and mixed at The Basement Studio, Outwood (UK)

External links 

1994 albums